Werner Wittig can refer to:

 Werner Wittig (painter) (1930-2013), German painter
 Werner Wittig (cyclist) (1909-1942), German cyclist